The paddyfield pipit or Oriental pipit (Anthus rufulus) is a small passerine bird in the pipit and wagtail family. It is a resident (non-migratory) breeder in open scrub, grassland and cultivation in southern Asia east to the Philippines. Although among the few breeding pipits in the Asian region, identification becomes difficult in winter when several other species migrate into the region. The taxonomy of the species is complex and has undergone considerable changes.

Description

This is a large pipit at 15 cm, but is otherwise an undistinguished looking bird, mainly streaked grey-brown above and pale below with breast streaking. It is long legged with a long tail and a long dark bill. Sexes are similar. Summer and winter plumages are similar. Young birds are more richly coloured below than adults and have the pale edges to the feathers of the upper parts more conspicuous with more prominent spotting on the breast. The population waitei from north-western India and Pakistan is pale while the population malayensis from the Western Ghats is larger, darker and more heavily streaked with the nominate rufulus intermediate.

In winter some care must be taken to distinguish this from other pipits that winter in the area, such as Richard's pipit, Anthus richardi and Blyth's pipit, Anthus godlewskii. The paddyfield pipit is smaller and dumpier, has a shorter looking tail and has weaker fluttering flight. The usually uttered characteristic chip-chip-chip call is quite different from usual calls of Richard's pipit (an explosive ) and Blyth's pipit (a nasal ). The tawny pipit has less streaking on the mantle and has a black loreal stripe and a longer tail. The Western Ghats population can appear very similar to the Nilgiri pipit.

Taxonomy and systematics
Some of the subspecies in the group were formerly treated as a subspecies of the Australasian pipit Anthus novaeseelandiae and the grouping has been in state of flux. Considerable colour and morphological variation with age and latitude make the species difficult to identify from museum specimens. Six subspecies are now included in this species.
 rufulus described by Louis Jean Pierre Vieillot in 1818 – found in most of Indian Subcontinent (except for the north-west, north and extreme south-west) east to southern China, south to southern Thailand and Indochina
 waitei described by Hugh Whistler in 1936 (not always recognized) is found in the dry zone of the north-western part of the Indian Subcontinent
 malayensis described by Thomas Campbell Eyton in 1839 is the dark form of the wet zone of the Western Ghats and Sri Lanka
 lugubris described by Viscount Walden in 1875 – found in Philippines; possibly also northern Borneo.
 albidus described by Erwin Stresemann in 1912 – found in Sulawesi, Bali and the western Lesser Sundas (Lombok, Sumbawa, Komodo, Padar, Rinca, Flores, Sumba).
 medius described by Wallace in 1864 – found in the eastern Lesser Sundas (Sawu, Roti, Timor, Kisar, Leti, Moa, Sermata).

Some authorities consider paddyfield pipit to be a subspecies of Richard's pipit, A. richardi.

Behaviour and ecology
A widespread species found in open habitats, especially short grassland and cultivation with open bare ground. It runs rapidly on the ground, and when flushed, does not fly far.

The paddyfield pipit breeds throughout the year but mainly in the dry season. Birds may have two or more broods in a year. During the breeding season, it sings by repeating a note during its descent from a short fluttery flight, a few feet above the ground. It builds its nest on the ground under a slight prominence, a tuft of grass, or at the edge of a bush. The nests are woven out of grass and leaves and are normally cup shaped. Exposed nests are sometimes domed or semi-domed, the long grass at the back and sides extending over the top. Nests are lined with finer grass or roots and sometimes with a little dry moss, bracken or other material at the base of the nest. The usual clutch is three or four eggs with greenish ground colour and numerous small brown specks at the larger end. When disturbed near the nest, the birds flutter nearby with weak tsip-tsip-tsip calls. Parent birds may also feign injury to distract predators. Mites are known to cause scaly leg lesions. It feeds principally on small insects but consumes larger beetles, tiny snails, worms etc. while walking on the ground, and may pursue insects like mosquitoes or termites in the air.

A species of Haemoproteus, H. anthi, has been described from this species.

Gallery

References

External links

 Photos, videos and sounds – Internet Bird Collection
 Photographs – Oriental Bird Images

paddyfield pipit
Birds of Bangladesh
Birds of South Asia
Birds of Southeast Asia
paddyfield pipit
paddyfield pipit